Muhammad Kaleem (born 1 October 1985) is a Pakistani-born cricketer who played for the United Arab Emirates national cricket team. He made his first-class debut for the United Arab Emirates against the Netherlands in the 2015–17 ICC Intercontinental Cup on 21 January 2016. He made his List A debut for the UAE against the Netherlands in the 2015–17 ICC World Cricket League Championship on 27 January 2016. He made his Twenty20 International (T20I) debut against the Netherlands on 3 February 2016.

References

External links
 

1985 births
Living people
Emirati cricketers
United Arab Emirates Twenty20 International cricketers
Cricketers from Gujranwala
Pakistani emigrants to the United Arab Emirates
Pakistani expatriate sportspeople in the United Arab Emirates